Tamara Nora Holder is an American attorney, author and television commentator. She is a former contributor and guest host on the Fox News Channel.

Career
Holder grew up in La Junta, Colorado. She is a graduate of the University of Arizona and the John Marshall Law School in Chicago, Illinois.

Holder is a former Fox News Channel contributor. Prior to Fox News Channel, she was a frequent guest on CNN, HLN and TruTV. She has written for The Huffington Post, The Daily Caller and GrassRoots (a medical marijuana magazine). Holder is a frequent radio guest on WABC's Hannity and guest co-hosted the show on December 26, 2012, with Bernard McGuirk. Holder guest hosted The Five on March 12 and 13, 2012. On July 12, 2007, Holder testified as an expert witness before the Congressional Committee of Transportation, Sub-Committee of Maritime and Infrastructure. Holder wrote the foreword to the book, Hanging on by My Fingernails. She also appeared in the 2012 film, Atlas Shrugged: Part II, in which she played herself, alongside Sean Hannity, Juan Williams and Bob Beckel.

In the summer of 2016, Holder alleged that she had been sexually assaulted the previous year by a male executive at Fox News. After investigation, the executive involved, Francisco Cortes, was fired and a financial settlement with Holder was reached in 2017. Holder departed Fox News when her contract expired on January 1, 2017.

References

External links

American women lawyers
American lawyers
Illinois lawyers
John Marshall Law School (Chicago) alumni
Lawyers from Chicago
Living people
University of Arizona alumni
1979 births
21st-century American women